Calling All Curs is a 1939 short subject directed by Jules White starring American slapstick comedy team The Three Stooges (Moe Howard, Larry Fine and Curly Howard). It is the 41st entry in the series released by Columbia Pictures starring the comedians, who released 190 shorts for the studio between 1934 and 1959.

Plot
The Stooges are skilled veterinarians at a pet hospital who are the proud surgeons of Garçon, a prized poodle of socialite Mrs. Bedford (Isabelle LaMal). After successfully removing a thorn from his paw, the Stooges entertain two men reporters (Lynton Brent, Cy Schindell) from The Daily Star looking to write a feature story about the team's clinic.

While enjoying a dinner of bones and dog biscuits with fellow pup patients, Garçon goes missing with a note left behind by the faux reporters demanding a $2,000 ransom and telling her not to contact the authorities, or she'll never see it again and it turns out that the two men are actually evil dognapping criminals. The boys frantically try to trick Mrs. Bedford by disguising a mutt as Garçon. However, when Mrs. Bedford's maid (Libby Taylor), who is frightened of dogs, accidentally vacuums a clump of glued-on fur off the mutt's shaggy coat, Mrs. Bedford threatens to throw the Stooges in jail.

Desperate, the trio use the mutt as a bloodhound to track down the dognappers. A fight ensues when they discover the enemies' hideout, with the Stooges emerging victorious. The Stooges, also, discover that Garcon gave birth to a litter of puppies.

Production notes
Filmed on December 27–30, 1938, the title Calling All Curs is a pun on the phrase "Calling all cars!" A colorized version of this film was released in 2006 as part of the DVD collection entitled "Stooges on the Run."

Garçon gives birth at the end of the short, and is referred to by feminine pronouns throughout. Garçon is French for “boy.”

This marks one of the few times the Stooges have respectable, professional careers as opposed to working as blue-collar laborers.

This was one of Curly Howard's favorite Stooge films as he was a well-known dog lover.

Footage was reused in the 1960 compilation feature film Stop! Look! and Laugh!

Quotes
Moe (to the Garçon in disguise): "Listen, bloodhound! If you got any 'blood' in you, you'd better start pointing and point out those dognappers! Get the point?!"
Curly: "Hmmm, n'yuk, n'yuk n'yuk. He must be a Pointsetter." (referring to the Poinsettia flower) also "I'm trying to think but nothing happens!"
Moe: "Quiet, you hot air-dale!" (referring to an Airedale Terrier and making a pun on the phrase "hot air" as in "empty talk intended to impress")

References

External links 
 
 
Calling All Curs at threestooges.net

1939 films
The Three Stooges films
Columbia Pictures short films
American black-and-white films
Films directed by Jules White
1939 comedy films
American slapstick comedy films
1930s English-language films
1930s American films